The 6th Secretariat of the Workers' Party of Korea (WPK)(6차 조선로동당 비서국), officially the Secretariat of the 6th Central Committee of the Workers' Party of Korea, was elected by the 1st Plenary Session of the 6th Central Committee in the immediate aftermath of the 6th WPK Congress.

Membership

1st Plenary Session

September 2010–April 2012
Kim Jong-il
Kim Ki-nam
Choe Thae-bok
Choe Ryong-hae
Mun Kyong-dok
Pak To-chun
Kim Yong-il
Kim Yang-gon
Kim Phyong-hae
Thae Jong-su
Hong Sok-hyong

Add-ons
 Kim Kyong-hui 
 Kwak Pom-gi

Notes

References

 

6th Secretariat of the Workers' Party of Korea